Tinissa mysorensis is a moth of the family Tineidae. It was described by Robinson in 1976. It is found in India.

References

Moths described in 1976
Scardiinae